Seamus Ó hÉilidhe (Anglicised: James O'Hely, died 1595) was an Irish Roman Catholic clergyman. He was appointed Archbishop of Tuam by the Holy See on 20 March 1591, and died in office in 1595.

References

1595 deaths
16th-century Roman Catholic bishops in Ireland
Christian clergy from County Mayo
Christian clergy from County Galway
Roman Catholic archbishops of Tuam
Year of birth unknown